The Principe starling (Lamprotornis ornatus), also known as the Príncipe glossy-starling, is a species of starling in the family Sturnidae. It is endemic to São Tomé and Príncipe. Its natural habitat is subtropical or tropical moist lowland forests.

Gallery

References

Principe starling
Endemic birds of São Tomé and Príncipe
Fauna of Príncipe
Principe starling
Taxonomy articles created by Polbot